Goychay District is one of the 66 districts of Azerbaijan. It is located in the centre of the country and belongs to the Central Aran Economic Region. The district borders the districts of Agdash, Qabala, Ismayilli, Kurdamir, and Ujar. Its capital and largest city is Goychay. As of 2020, the district had a population of 121,700. It is famous for its pomegranate growing industry, and for its pomegranate festival.

Geography 
Goychay region is located in Shirvan valley, at the footsteps of Greater Caucasus mountain range. It stretches for about 25 km from north to south and 40 km from east to west, making up 726 km2 in total. The capital of the district Goychay lies on the 216th km of Baku-Qazakh Highway and 18 km away from Ujar railway station. Geographically, the region is divided into mountainous terrain and lowlands. Bozdag Qaramaryam mountain range makes up the mountainous part. The distance between Goychay region and capital Baku is 226 km. The region consists of a city and 55 villages. The biggest populated settlements include Bığır, Ləkçılpaq, Çaxırlı and İncə villages.

Goychay and Yukhari Shirvan rivers pass through the region which contributes to raw materials used for products used for construction. Goychay is rich with river rocks and soft sand, and the clay deposits found in the vicinity of Qarabaqqal village are used for brick production.

Climate 
The geographical location of the region has been affected by the climate of the Goychay district as its territory is located in semi-desert and mountainous areas. Due to the above geographical conditions, the climate of the region has its own attributes. In the territory of the district, the dominant climate is the mild hot semi-arid and dry subtropical climate. This climate type is characterized by its mild and moisture winter and dry and warm summer. In the Goychay region, the climate can be classified into 2 categories; the first includes the territories located in the south part of Goychay, and the second is the climate of the villages located at the foot of the Greater Caucasus. Because of moderate and humid air conditions in the north foothills (mountainous part) as well as in the eastern warmer part, the region has huge potential for agriculture. The rest of the region is cold in the winter and hot in the summer which requires the usage of irrigation.

Hydrography 
The existing river network in the Goychay region flows from the Greater Caucasus to the Kur-Araz lowland. The inland waters of the district are included in the hydrologic basin of the Shirvan region. The rivers are fed by snow, rain and ground water. The main river in the district is the Goychay River that belongs to the basin of the southern slopes of the Greater Caucasus Mountains, as well as the Kur. It is considered as transit river in Shirvan plain. The total length of Goychay river is 115 km and the catchment area is 1770 km2. The average water flow rate in the river is 12.5 m / sec, the maximum speed is 70m / s. Goychay river is fed by 12% of snow, 28% rainfall and 60% underground waters. The average annual water consumption of the river is 12kub m / sec, of which 30-35% is in spring, 20-25% in summer, 18-22% in fall, and 15-17% occur in winter. Nohurqıslaq water reservoir built in the Gabala district supplies water to the river in summer when there is a decrease in its flow. The second long river in the area of the district is the Arvan River. The Arvan river flows from Arvan Mountain which is located 12 km away from the city. It often caused floods in spring in the past. In order to prevent this, the dam was built between 1972 and 1980 and the direction of its water changed to the Goychay River. The Arvan River dries up during the hot months of the year. Shilian River is another river in the region that is a branch of the Goychay River.

History 
The name of the region was taken from Goychay River which means "Blue River" (Göy çay) in Azerbaijani language due to the very clean nature and transparency of the river and light blue colour of the water.
Due to a 1859 earthquake in Shamakhi, many of its residents moved to the west establishing a village of Goychay. Because of demographic growth, the Russian Imperial government created Goychay Uyezd within Baku Governorate during its administrative reforms in December 1867. The region was established as an administrative unit of Azerbaijan SSR on 8 August 1930.

Economy 
The economy Goychay district is based on industrial agriculture, consumer market, transportation, and communication. The total value of goods produced by various enterprises, organizations, and individuals operating in the region was approximately 248,331.0 thousand AZN according to the statistics of 2016. The share of industry in economy was 32077,6 thousand AZN or 12,9% of the total output, 88641,4 thousand AZN or 35,7% in agriculture, 27019,9 thousand AZN or 10,9% in construction, 4719,9 thousand AZN or 1,9 percent in transportation, 805.2 thousand AZN or 0.3 percent in communication, 95067.0 thousand AZN or 38.3 percent in trade and services. Goychay is also famous for its wine-making industry which started rapidly growing in the 1970s. In the 1970s and 1980s, pomegranate refining factory, cotton factory, milk production plant, bread making plant, grape products refinery plants were built. Economic sector of the region is agriculture. This sector is based upon grain-growing, cattle-breeding, silkworm-breeding, grape and fruit growing.

Industry 
The region's industry was mainly represented by food, non-metallic mineral products, electricity, and the distribution of gas and water. The region has great potential for the production of vine and cognac due to the development of the productivity of viticulture.  In 2016, the total production by industrial enterprises of the region as well local private firms was worth around 32077.6 thousand AZN at actual prices and the volume of industrial production increased by 26.9% compared to 2015. The share of total industrial output was 17% in the state sector and 83.0% in the non-state sector, respectively.

Agriculture 
The major agricultural outputs of the region are grain, fruits, vegetables, and dairy products related to livestock. Potatoes, melons, and grapes are also cultivated in the local farms.  The actual cost of gross output of agriculture in 2016 amounted to 88641.4 thousand AZN, of which 43553.2 thousand AZN fell to share of cattle-breeding and 45088.2 AZN thousand to fruit and vegetable products. During the first half of 2016, 37067 tons of grain, 548 tons of corn, 1871 tons of potatoes, 19018 tons of vegetables, 619 tons of melons, 61779 tons of fruits and berries and 502 tons of grapes were produced in the local farms of the region. Moreover, 42.34 hectares of new orchards were built in order to obtain growth in the share of agriculture in the region. In 2016, 151 tons of cotton was supplied in the region. The statistics of January 1, 2017, indicated that the number of livestock in the region was like the following:  cattle (38047), including 19566 cows and camels, 57019 sheep and goats. 51.4 percent of the total livestock of the district consisted of cows and buffalos. In 2017, 7543 hectares of wheat and 7074 hectares are barley are sown in Goychay district (total 14617 hectares).

Tourism

Transportation 

In 2016, 893 thousand tons of cargo and 13697 thousand passengers were transported. Compared to 2015, 25 thousand tons or 2.9 percent of cargo and 514 thousand people or 3.9 percent more passengers were transported.  Transportation routes connecting Baku with the city center.

Communication 
In 2016, the total cost of various communication services was worth 805.2 thousand AZN provided by enterprises located within the district or Azerbaijan. It was 33.9 thousand AZN or 4.4% more than in 2015.

Demographic information 
The population of Goychay region is 111,400 (2011 census). The average population density in the city equals to 145 persons per square km. Approximately 32.89% of the population lives in Goychay city, 67.11% live in the villages. Goychay is home to many nationalities. Ethnic composition is as follows:
 Azerbaijanis - 99,086
 Russians - 189
 Lezgins - 1,054
 Ukrainians - 58
 Turks - 36
 Jews - 22
 Tatars - 28
 Avars - 2
 Georgians - 2
 Kurds - 6
 Armenians - 3
 Other minorities - 25

Prominent people from Goychay
 Habibi
 Ali khan Gantemir
 Rasul Rza
 Ali Kerim
 Anvar Mammadkhanli
 Isgender Coshgun
 Anar Rzayev
 Ali Samadli
 Ibrahim Goychayli
 Emin Mahmudov

Festivals 
Goychay Pomegranate Festival is a major event that takes place annually in the city of Goychay starting on 3 November 2006 by Ministry of Culture and Tourism of the Republic of Azerbaijan and the Executive Authority of the Goychay Region. The event embraces a fair and an exhibition of Azerbaijani fruit-cuisine that presents different varieties of pomegranates as well as many kinds of pomegranate products produced in local enterprises. Within the framework of this event, holding a parade has become an integral part of the festival which includes traditional Azerbaijani dances and Azerbaijani music. The competitions such as the biggest pomegranate or pomegranate eating competition are minor events held to make the festival more attractive for the visitors. Festival usually takes place in autumn (mainly in October).

References

External links
 Goychay website
 Map of the region

 
Districts of Azerbaijan